The 1984 Jacksonville State Gamecocks football team represented Jacksonville State University as a member of the Gulf South Conference (GSC) during the 1984 NCAA Division II football season. Led by first-year head coach Joe Hollis, the Gamecocks compiled an overall record of 4–5–1 with a mark of 4–4 in conference play, and finished fifth in the GSC. Hollis was hired as the Gamecocks' head coach in January 1984, and resigned a year later after only a single season to become offensive line coach at Georgia.

Schedule

References

Jacksonville State
Jacksonville State Gamecocks football seasons
Jacksonville State Gamecocks football